Thorybes mexicana, the Mexican cloudywing, mountain cloudy wing or Nevada cloudy wing, is a butterfly of the family Hesperiidae. It is found in the high elevation mountains of the western United States south into Mexico.

Subspecies confusis is often treated as a separate species, known as the confused cloudywing or eastern cloudywing (Thorybes confusis). This subspecies is found from southeastern Pennsylvania west to Missouri, south along the Atlantic Coastal plain to central Florida, the Gulf Coast and Texas. Strays can be found up to southeastern Kansas, southern Illinois and New Jersey.

Adults are on wing from June to August. There is one generation per year.

The larvae feed on Trifolium, Vicia and Lathyrus species. Adults feed on flower nectar.

Subspecies
Thorybes mexicana mexicana (Mexico)
Thorybes mexicana nevada (California, Oregon)
Thorybes mexicana confusis (Florida) - confused cloudywing or eastern cloudywing 
Thorybes mexicana dobra (Mexico, Arizona)
Thorybes mexicana ducia (Panama)

References

External links
Mexican cloudywing  at Butterflies and Moths of North America
Confused cloudywing at Butterflies and Moths of North America

Thorybes
Butterflies of North America
Butterflies described in 1869
Hesperiidae of South America
Taxa named by Gottlieb August Wilhelm Herrich-Schäffer